Mabanda means Pathfinder (the way finder). Mabanda is also named after human beings for example, Mabanda Shita Mayankwa from Zambia.And
Mabanda is a city located close to the southern tip of Burundi, near the border with Tanzania.

References
Fitzpatrick, M., Parkinson, T., & Ray, N. (2006) East Africa. Footscray, VIC: Lonely Planet.

Populated places in Burundi